The Women's individual competition at the Biathlon World Championships 2021 was held on 16 February 2021.

Results
The race was started at 12:05.

References

Women's individual